Jasper Township is a civil township of Midland County in the U.S. state of Michigan. The population was 1,145 at the 2000 census.

Communities 
A rural post office operated from March 6, 1876, until October 15, 1910.

Geography

Demographics
As of the census of 2000, there were 1,145 people, 418 households, and 311 families residing in the township. There were 436 housing units at an average density of 12.1 per square mile (4.7/km2). The racial makeup of the township was 97.82% White, 0.26% Native American, 0.17% Asian, 1.40% from other races, and 0.35% from two or more races. Hispanic or Latino of any race were 1.92% of the population.

There were 418 households, out of which 33.7% had children under the age of 18 living with them, 64.4% were married couples living together, 6.2% had a female householder with no husband present, and 25.4% were non-families. 18.9% of all households were made up of individuals, and 7.7% had someone living alone who was 65 years of age or older.  The average household size was 2.74 and the average family size was 3.15.

In the township the population was spread out, with 27.4% under the age of 18, 7.9% from 18 to 24, 31.6% from 25 to 44, 22.8% from 45 to 64, and 10.2% who were 65 years of age or older.  The median age was 36 years. For every 100 females, there were 107.8 males.  For every 100 females age 18 and over, there were 111.5 males.

The median income for a household in the township was $39,432, and the median income for a family was $47,656. Males had a median income of $36,250 versus $22,434 for females. The per capita income for the township was $16,741.  About 4.3% of families and 7.1% of the population were below the poverty line, including 5.6% of those under age 18 and 13.3% of those age 65 or over.

References

Townships in Midland County, Michigan
Townships in Michigan